This is a partial list of public art in Palm Desert, California in the United States.  This list applies only to works of public art accessible in an outdoor public space. For example, this does not include artwork visible inside a museum or religious artwork associated with a church or place of worship.

References

California culture
Lists of public art in California
Public art
Tourist attractions in California
Palm Desert